The Metcalfe Jets are a Junior "C" ice hockey team based out of Metcalfe, Ontario.  They initially played in Junior "B" out of the Eastern Ontario Junior Hockey League which was re-branded to the Central Canada Hockey League 2.  For the 2017-18 season the franchise became members of the National Capital Junior Hockey League.

History
Following the 2014-15 season the Eastern Ontario Junior Hockey League and the Central Canada Hockey League became associated. There were changes to the Junior B league including the re-branding, reduction of teams, and association with a revised midget league. The new EOJHL became the Central Canada Hockey League Tier 2 and the Jets were part of the Martin Division.

Starting the 2017-18 season the Jets moved to the National Capital Junior Hockey League changing from junior "B" to junior "C" level hockey.

Season-by-season results

Notable alumni
Marc Savard
Larry Robinson
Shayne James

External links
Jets Webpage
 National Capital Junior Hockey website

Eastern Ontario Junior B Hockey League teams
Ice hockey clubs established in 1967